Lake Rotopounamu (also known as Greenstone Lake, from the Māori  (lake) and  (greenstone)) is a secluded lake in the Pihanga Scenic Reserve, in the Tongariro National Park in New Zealand's Central North Island. It lies at the northwest foot of Mt Pihanga, and was formed by a landslide around 10,000 years ago. The lake is fed by seven streams, but has no visible surface outflow. It is believed to drain underground.

Recreation 
Around the lake is a scenic  loop track, which can be accessed from the Pihanga Saddle road (State Highway 47) between Turangi and Tongariro. Walking this track takes about two hours.

References

Tongariro Volcanic Centre
Taupō District
Rotopounamu